Slobodan Krčmarević (born 12 June 1965) is a Serbian former professional footballer who played as a forward and current manager.

Club career
After coming through the youth system of Partizan, Krčmarević made his first-team debut in the 1983–84 season. He went on loan to Yugoslav Second League side Bor in early 1986 and spent there the next one and a half years. In the summer of 1987, Krčmarević joined OFK Beograd, scoring 24 goals in 57 appearances over the next two seasons in the Second League.

In the summer of 1991, Krčmarević returned to his parent club Partizan. He spent two seasons in his second spell at Stadion JNA and collected two trophies. In the summer of 1993, Krčmarević moved abroad for the second time and joined Cypriot club Apollon Limassol. He was the team's top scorer in each of the following three seasons and won the championship in his debut season.

International career
Krčmarević was additionally called up to Yugoslavia's UEFA Euro 1992 squad. However, the country received a ban just days before the tournament due to the Yugoslav Wars and the team returned home.

Managerial career
After serving as manager of OFK Beograd, Krčmarević spent two years at the helm of the Serbia national under-21 team, between 2007 and 2009. He left the position after the team exited in the group stage at the 2009 UEFA European Under-21 Championship.

From February to October 2010, Krčmarević was manager of Apollon Limassol, winning the Cypriot Cup in the 2009–10 season. He also briefly worked at fellow Cypriot First Division side Anorthosis from November to December of the same year.

In 2011, Krčmarević took charge of the Kazakhstan national under-21 team, signing a contract until the end of 2012. He also simultaneously served as manager at Kazakhstan Premier League side Zhetysu in 2012.

Career statistics

Honours

Player
Partizan
First League of FR Yugoslavia: 1992–93
Yugoslav Cup: 1991–92

Apollon Limassol
Cypriot First Division: 1993–94

Anorthosis
Cypriot First Division: 1997–98
Cypriot Cup: 1997–98

Manager
Apollon Limassol
Cypriot Cup: 2009–10

References

External links

1965 births
Living people
Footballers from Belgrade
Yugoslav footballers
Serbia and Montenegro footballers
Serbian footballers
Association football forwards
FK Partizan players
FK Bor players
OFK Beograd players
Vasalunds IF players
Apollon Limassol FC players
Enosis Neon Paralimni FC players
Anorthosis Famagusta F.C. players
Panionios F.C. players
PAOK FC players
Yugoslav First League players
Yugoslav Second League players
Ettan Fotboll players
First League of Serbia and Montenegro players
Cypriot First Division players
Super League Greece players
Yugoslav expatriate footballers
Serbia and Montenegro expatriate footballers
Yugoslav expatriate sportspeople in Sweden
Serbia and Montenegro expatriate sportspeople in Cyprus
Serbia and Montenegro expatriate sportspeople in Greece
Expatriate footballers in Sweden
Expatriate footballers in Cyprus
Expatriate footballers in Greece
Serbian football managers
FK Partizan non-playing staff
OFK Beograd managers
Serbia national under-21 football team managers
Apollon Limassol FC managers
Anorthosis Famagusta F.C. managers
Kazakhstan national under-21 football team managers
FC Zhetysu managers
Doxa Katokopias FC managers
NK Rudar Velenje managers
FK Pobeda managers
FK Željezničar Sarajevo managers
Serbian SuperLiga managers
Premier League of Bosnia and Herzegovina managers
Serbian expatriate football managers
Serbian expatriate sportspeople in Cyprus
Serbian expatriate sportspeople in Kazakhstan
Serbian expatriate sportspeople in Libya
Serbian expatriate sportspeople in Slovenia
Serbian expatriate sportspeople in Bahrain
Serbian expatriate sportspeople in North Macedonia
Serbian expatriate sportspeople in Bosnia and Herzegovina
Expatriate football managers in Cyprus
Expatriate football managers in Kazakhstan
Expatriate football managers in Libya
Expatriate football managers in Slovenia
Expatriate football managers in Bahrain
Expatriate football managers in North Macedonia
Expatriate football managers in Bosnia and Herzegovina